Al-Khwarizmi International College Foundation, Inc. (AKIC) is an institution of higher learning in Marawi City, Philippines. It was founded by the Ranao Council.

References

External links
Al-Khwarizmi International College website

Education in Marawi
Educational institutions with year of establishment missing
Universities and colleges in Lanao del Sur